Medard is a French unisex given name, which is a form of the name Medardus, derived from Mahtahard, meaning "brave" or "hardy". The French variant is Medárd and the Italian variant is Medardo. The name may refer to: 
 
Medard Albrand (1898–1981), French politician
Medard Boss (1903–1990), Swiss psychiatrist
Medard des Groseilliers (1618–1696), French explorer 
Medardo Fantuzzi (1906–1986), Italian automotive engineer
Medard Gabel (born 1946), American writer
Medardo Martínez (born 1988), Nicaraguan footballer 
Medard Mulangala (born 1957), Congo politician
Medardo Rosso (1858–1928), Italian sculptor
Medardo Ángel Silva (1898–1919), Ecuadorian poet
Medard Tytgat (1871–1948), Belgian artist
Medard Welch (1892–1980), American  scientist

References

Medard(us) de Nympz (1243),Transylvanian Saxon Gräf (Comes)

German masculine given names
French masculine given names
Hungarian masculine given names